Vlastislav was mythological prince of Lucko (by Žatec). Son of legendary Czech prince Vojen, a brother another prince Vnislav.

Dalimil´s chronic and Kosmas don't match in this what when was he died prince Nezamysl. Dalimil writes: 

The people of Lucko was Bohemian tribe by legends and their rulers of Přemyslids Dynasty. By Kosmas: Lucko ceased the rule of prince Neklan whose an army in the conflict by Tursko scored a hard Lucko's army of Vlastislav.

Mythical Bohemian princes
Slavic mythology
Mythological kings
Fictional Czech people